Salem Cemetery may refer to various cemeteries, all in the United States (shown alphabetically by State):

Old Salem Church and Cemetery, Catonsville, Baltimore County, Maryland
Salem Street Burying Ground, Medford, Massachusetts
Harmony Grove Cemetery, Salem, Massachusetts
Salem Methodist Episcopal Church and Salem Walker Cemetery, Salem, Michigan
Salem Cemetery, Racine Township, Mower County, Minnesota
Salem Cemetery, Cape Girardeau, Missouri
St. John's Episcopal Cemetery, Salem, New Jersey
Salem Fields Cemetery, Brooklyn, New York
Salem Welsh Church, Freedom, New York
Revolutionary War Cemetery, also called the Old Salem Burying Ground, Salem, New York
Salem Union Church and Cemetery, Maiden, North Carolina
Salem Cemetery (Winston-Salem, North Carolina)
Salem Pioneer Cemetery, Salem, Oregon
City View Cemetery, Salem, Oregon
Salem Cemetery, Auglaize Township, Allen County, Ohio